Holger Chen or Chen Chih-han (born March 12, 1979), is a Taiwanese internet celebrity, entrepreneur, political activist and mixed martial artist. He is also known popularly as Kuan Chang (literally "gym manager") in Taiwan, being the founder and CEO of G.K. Fitness Club, named after Genghis Khan. As an actor, Chen had his first appearance as a cameo in the 2008 film Parking. He is referred by some as the Joe Rogan of Taiwan.

Early life 
Born Chen Szu-han in Luzhou Township, Taipei County, Chen was raised by a single mother and has an elder sister. His father, born to a wealthy family in Yilan, was a businessman who settled in the United States. However, Chen's mother was his father's mistress, and she was largely left to fend for herself and her children in Taiwan. His father died when he was a first-grader in elementary school.

Hailing from a poor single family, Chen was often beaten and bullied by his schoolmates in his youth. The fathers of his bullies would sometimes join the abuse. When Chen was 15, he dropped out of school and began working to support his family.

Chen served in the Republic of China Marine Corps from 1998 to 2001. During his military service, he was involved in the relief operation of the 1999 Jiji earthquake.

After discharge from Marine Corps service, Chen was working odd jobs such as porter, deliveryman and salesman. He later joined the United Bamboo Gang for two years and had more than 100 men under him at one point. To support his men, Chen had to take on credit card loans. After he quit the triad, he became a restaurateur with the help of friends to pay off his debt. Chen often warns his audience against the dangers of working in organized crime.

Fitness center manager 
In 2014, Chen opened his first fitness center, G.K. Fitness Club. It was one of the first gyms in Taiwan to popularize and offer mixed martial arts training to the public. He now leads six fitness centers in New Taipei City and Taoyuan City.

Being an internet celebrity and blogger, he often expresses his opinion on current affairs and politics through live streaming and social media platforms.

Chen is also a philanthropist concerned with the welfare of underprivileged Taiwanese people.

Political activist 
In 2019, Chen and New Power Party legislator Huang Kuo-chang organized  in Taipei against pro-China media. The rally was attended by tens of thousands of people.

Assassination attempt 
On August 28, 2020 at 2 A.M, Chen was shot at his New Taipei City gym by an unknown assailant three times. According to witnesses at the scene, the bullets hit his right arm, thigh and ankle. Despite the pain caused by the bullets, Chen managed to host a live stream on Facebook regarding the incident. He said: "I was shot twice. I hope that if I die this time, please everyone carry on my spirit, you must carry on my spirit. Please everyone take care of my wife and child, I beg everyone. Also, my mother, I beg everyone. Argh, my right thigh was hit." Chen was then escorted to a nearby hospital. According to local media reports, a man known by his surname "Liu" turned himself to the police. It was believed that he encountered Chen several times and allegedly sexually harassed him.

Personal life 
Chen is married, and he has a son and a stepdaughter from his wife's previous marriage. Chen has a pet Caucasian Shepherd dog named Ta-hsiung and also has a few cats, including most notably, a Maine Coon named Rich, which often appears on his YouTube livestreams.

References

External links
 Holger Chen's channel on YouTube
  

Living people
1979 births
Mixed martial arts people
People from New Taipei
Taiwanese YouTubers